Windsor Harbor Road Bridge is a historic Pratt through truss bridge located at Kimmswick, Jefferson County, Missouri. It was built in 1874-1875 by the Keystone Bridge Company; the bridge was dismantled and re-erected at its present site in 1930.

It was listed on the National Register of Historic Places in 1983.

A sign outside the bridge states:
WINDSOR HARBOR ROAD BRIDGE
Carondelet, Missouri, 1874-1928
Moved to this site 1930
The County Commission of Jefferson County, Missouri, transferred ownership of this bridge to the Kimmswick Historical Society following its placement on the National Register of Historic Places.

Since the construction of the adjacent modern bridge, this historic bridge has been closed to all but pedestrian and non-motorized traffic.

See also
List of bridges documented by the Historic American Engineering Record in Missouri

References

External links
National Register of Historic Places: Jefferson County

Bridges completed in 1875
Road bridges on the National Register of Historic Places in Missouri
Buildings and structures in Jefferson County, Missouri
Pedestrian bridges in Missouri
Former road bridges in the United States
Relocated buildings and structures in Missouri
Historic American Engineering Record in Missouri
National Register of Historic Places in Jefferson County, Missouri
1875 establishments in Missouri